The Divine Woman (1928) is an American silent film directed by Victor Sjöström and starring Greta Garbo. Produced and distributed by Metro-Goldwyn-Mayer. Only a single nine-minute reel and an additional 45-second excerpt are currently known to exist of this otherwise lost film, the only whole copy of which was destroyed in the 1965 MGM vault fire.

The film grossed $541,000 in the USA and $390,000 internationally, its worldwide gross was $931,000 and generated MGM a profit of $354,000.

Origin
The film is adapted from the 1925 Broadway play Starlight by Gladys Unger, which starred Doris Keane. The plot is loosely based on stories of the early life of the French actress Sarah Bernhardt.

Plot
Marianne (Greta Garbo) is a poor French country girl who goes to Paris in the 1860s to seek her fortune as an actress. As she rises to success in the theatre, she must choose between the romantic attentions of two men. The first is Lucien (Lars Hanson), a poor but passionate young soldier who deserts the army to be with Marianne and goes to jail after stealing a dress to give her. Her other suitor is Henry Legrand (Lowell Sherman), a wealthy middle-aged Paris producer who offers her fame and fortune.

Cast
Greta Garbo as Marianne
Lars Hanson as Lucien
Lowell Sherman as Henry Legrand
Polly Moran as Mme. Pigonier
Dorothy Cumming as Mme. Zizi Rouck, Marianne's Mother
Johnny Mack Brown as Jean Lery
Cesare Gravina as Gigi
Paulette Duval as Paulette
Jean De Briac as Stage Director

Existing reel
Only one reel from the film is known to exist. It runs nine minutes and was discovered in 1993 at the Gosfilmofond, a film archive in Moscow. This film fragment has been released on DVD with a collection of Garbo films and has been broadcast on Turner Classic Movies. Its Russian intertitles have been translated into English. In this section of the film, Marianne is seen living in Paris in modest rooms. After a playful interchange with the landlady Mme. Pigionier, Marianne is joined by Lucien. The two lovers share a few poignant minutes together as the time approaches for him to return to the army.

See also
List of incomplete or partially lost films

References

External links

portrait of Garbo and Lowell Sherman from the film(archived)

1928 films
American silent feature films
Films directed by Victor Sjöström
Lost American films
Metro-Goldwyn-Mayer films
American romantic drama films
American black-and-white films
1928 lost films
1928 romantic drama films
1920s American films
Silent romantic drama films
Silent American drama films